Acharya Bangalore B School (ABBS) is a business school in India. ABBS is a privately-held institution and is affiliated to Bangalore University. The institution is also approved by All India Council for Technical Education and is recognized by University Grants Commission. ABBS has academic partnership with multiple international universities including Daito Bunka University, Wenzhou University, St. Mary's University, Sunway University and Rennes School of Business. The institution is also an advanced signatory with United Nations-supported initiative The Principles for Responsible Management Education (PRME).

History and accreditation
Acharya Bangalore B School was established, in 2008, by B. Vijaypal Reddy. The institution is managed by Samagra Shikshana Samithi Trust, a not for profit organization based in Karnataka, India, in Bangalore. The institution imparts education in Management, Life sciences, Commerce, Computer science and Mass communication. The institution has student faculty ratio of 15:1. Acharya Bangalore B School has permanent affiliation with Bangalore University and is approved by Ministry of Human Resource Development as well as Government of Karnataka. The institution is accredited with Grade A by National Assessment and Accreditation Council with CGPA of 3.23/4.0 in its second cycle. ABBS is recognized by University Grants Commission (India) under the criteria 2f and 12b. Acharya Bangalore B School is also accredited by International Assembly for Collegiate Business Education. The institution is a member of Association of Management Development Institutions of South Asia (AMDISA), a SAARC body based in Hyderabad, India and is approved by All India Council for Technical Education. The MBA department of the institution is accredited by National Board of Accreditation. ABBS became member of CII in 2019.

Overview

ABBS Center for Research and Development (ACRD)
ABBS Center for Research and Development (ACRD) is a research center within the campus of Acharya Bangalore B School. The research center was established in 2008.

ABBS E-Cell
ABBS E-Cell was established in 2008. ABBS E-Cell is a non-profit entity, committed to encourage entrepreneurship among students of Acharya Bangalore B School. ABBS E-Cell was established with the support of National Entrepreneurship Network and Enactus and have supported in starting more than 20 startups since inception.

Rankings
In 2016, Acharya Bangalore B School was ranked among the Top 1% of the best B-schools in India. The institution is verified as a Global League Institute (2014-2016) as a Great Place To Study and Research Institute, London. In December 2017, ABBS was ranked with 40th Best B-Schools in the B-School survey by Business India. Acharya Bangalore B School has been ranked 21st best B-School in India by Careers360. The institution is also listed among the top 6 private business schools in Bangalore by Businessworld.

2019
By the end of 2019, ABBS was ranked as follows:-
 13th Best B-School, South Zone, Times B-School Survey 2019
 10 Best Campuses for Research and Innovation, CEOInsights 2019
 5th Top B-School of Eminence, CSR-GHRDC B-School Survey 2019
 9th Best B-School in Karnataka, CSR-GHRDC B-School Survey 2019
2020

 10th Best B-School, South Zone, Times B-School Survey 2020

ABBS Management Business and Entrepreneurship Review (AMBER)
ABBS Management Business and Entrepreneurship Review, commonly known as AMBER, is a peer-reviewed academic journal published by Acharya Business B School. The journal is published biannually and catalogues original research papers from academic, social and corporate sectors.

TEDxABBS
ABBS hosted its first TED event in January 2019 with various speakers from different fields. The institution hosted TEDxABBSWomen in December 2019 with the theme Bold + Brilliant.

References

External links
Official website

Business schools in Bangalore
Colleges affiliated to Bangalore University
Colleges in Bangalore
International schools in Bangalore
Educational institutions established in 2008
2008 establishments in Karnataka